Herberth Armando Ríos  (born 28 September 1956) is a retired Colombian football goalkeeper. He played for Once Caldas and Independiente Santa Fe in the 1980s.

International career
Ríos appeared for the senior Colombia national football team, including the 1979 Copa América.

He also played for Colombia at the 1980 Olympic Games in Moscow.

References

1956 births
Living people
Association football goalkeepers
Colombian footballers
Colombia international footballers
Footballers at the 1980 Summer Olympics
Olympic footballers of Colombia
1979 Copa América players
Once Caldas footballers
Independiente Santa Fe footballers